Sharlyk is a rural locality (a selo) and the administrative center of Sharlyksky District, Orenburg Oblast, Russia. Population:

References

Notes

Sources

Rural localities in Orenburg Oblast
Orenburgsky Uyezd